The Pan African Climate Justice Alliance (PACJA) is a network of more than 1000 organisations from 48 countries in Africa. It is based in Kenya and consists of NGOs, grassroots organisations, trusts, foundations, indigenous communities, farmers, community-based organisations, and religious organisations. It advocates for climate and environmental justice and it is a people-centered consortium. It was co-founded by climate activists Augustine B Njamnshi and Mithika Mwenda.

Objectives 
The PACJA wants to promote poverty reduction and develop positions based on equity, which are relevant for Africa in international climate change politics. The network wants a global environment without the threats of climate change and advocates for a development process based on equity and justice for all human beings. The goal of the network is to be an African platform for civil society organisations to make information available, to find strategies, to engage with African governments and other important stakeholders, and to stand for justice and fairness in the international climate change dialogue. It aims at creating sustainable development processes in order to protect both the climate, the human rights, and the pro-poor growth.

Activities 
In 2017, the PACJA created a petition to stop France and the EU from interfering in the African Renewable Energy Initiative (AREI). The AREI unit is based at the African Development Bank (AfDB) headquarters in Abidjan. Organisations from across dozens of countries supported the petition, including groups such as Greenpeace Mauritius, Somali Climate Change Network, Human Rights and Legal Aid Network of Sudan, Journalists for Climate Change in Nigeria, and Young Volunteers for Environment Zambia. These groups were worried about the EU and France interfering with investment plans in developing renewable energy in Africa.

The PACJA created the ACCER Awards in 2013 to reward and sustain excellence in environmental journalism.

Website 
 Official website

References 

Climate change
Non-profit organizations based in Africa
Renewable energy